Refi Cevat Ulunay (Damascas, Syria: 1890-1968) was a Syrian-Turkish writer, and a controversial journalist and novelist during the Ottoman era.

Early life and career
Ulunay was born in Ottoman Damascus in 1890. He began writing for numerous Ottoman newspapers on topics such as literature, culture, philosophy and the arts. He strongly criticized the Union and Progress Party between the years 1914 and 1918, and his writings opposing the Turkish Independence War lead to his exile until 1938. Upon arriving in the Republic of Turkey, Ulunay was a columnist for the Turkish newspaper "Milliyet". He also wrote several books; the themes of love and sexuality are particularly dominant in "Köle" (1945) and "Eski İstanbul Yosmaları" (1959).

References

People from Damascus
Syrian people of Turkish descent
1890 births
1968 deaths
20th-century journalists from the Ottoman Empire
Turkish journalists
20th-century Turkish journalists
20th-century journalists